Pierangela Baronchelli (born 8 November 1972) is an Italian female sky runner (former steeplechase runner), European champion (2007) and vice-European champion (2008) in the SkyRace.

Biography
Before practicing skyrunning, Baronchelli had practiced athletics, in 2001, in the 3000 metres steeplechase, she became the first female Italian champion of this new specialty.

Achievements

National titles
Italian Mountain Running Championships
Mountain running: 2000

References

External links
 
Pierangela Baronchelli profile at All-Athletics

1972 births
Living people
Italian sky runners
Italian female steeplechase runners